Lady in Danger is a 1934 British comedy thriller film directed by Tom Walls and starring Walls, Yvonne Arnaud and Anne Grey. The screenplay was by Ben Travers.

Plot
In the mythical European country of Ardenberg, General Dittling (Leon M. Lion) stages a military coup. His supporters believe that he will set up a republic but it is actually his desire to restore the monarchy.  Therefore, he persuades British businessman Richard Dexter (Tom Walls) to escort the Queen (Yvonne Arnaud) to the safety of England. Once there his relations with the Queen are farcically misconstrued, when his fiancée Lydia (Anne Gray) arrives unannounced. After many adventures, the King (Hugh Wakefield), who has fled to Paris, is reunited with his wife.

Cast
 Tom Walls - Richard Dexter
 Yvonne Arnaud - Queen of Ardenberg
 Anne Grey - Lydia
 Leon M. Lion - Dittling
 Hugh Wakefield - King
 Marie Lohr - Lady Brockley
 Alfred Drayton - Quill
 Leonora Corbett - Marcelle
 O. B. Clarence -Nelson
 Cecil Parker - Piker
 Harold Warrender - Clive
 Hubert Harben - Matterby
 Charles Lefeaux - Hotel Manager
 Dorothy Galbraith - Mrs. Quill
 Jane Cornell - Shop Assistant
 Mervyn Johns - Reporter

Critical reception
TV Guide described the film  as "a vague comedy that refuses to commit itself to a romance between the leads" ; while Allmovie called it an "airy comedy-melodrama...the farcical possibilities of Lady in Danger are played to the hilt, and the rest is good semi-clean fun."

Life imitates art
Lady in Danger was released in 1934, two years before the beginning of the Spanish Civil War. However, there are some intriguing parallels between the movie and the later civil war, particularly the similarities between the fictional General Dittling and the real-life Generalissimo Francisco Franco. During the war, Franco was part of the Spanish Confederation of Autonomous Right-wing Groups. He later became the dictatorial ruler of Spain. In 1969, in a surprise move, the monarchist-leaning Franco designated Prince Juan Carlos de Borbón as his successor. When Franco died in 1975, he was indeed succeeded by the prince as King Juan Carlos I.

References

Bibliography
 Sutton, David R. A chorus of raspberries: British film comedy 1929-1939. University of Exeter Press, 2000.

External links

1934 films
1930s comedy thriller films
Films directed by Tom Walls
British comedy thriller films
Films scored by Jack Beaver
Films about coups d'état
British black-and-white films
1934 comedy films
1930s English-language films
1930s British films